The House of Knowledge was an ancient university of the Fatimid Caliphate (today's Egypt), built in 1004 CE as a library and converted by the Fatimid Imam-Caliph al-Hakim bi-Amr Allah to a state university in the same year.

The 15th-century historian al-Maqrizi records that "The House of Wisdom in Cairo did not open its doors to the public except before the furnishing, decoration and beautification of all the doors and corridors, and many servants were appointed. And the number of shelves in forty cabinets, each one of them could accommodate about eighteen thousand books. And (the shelves) were open, and books accessible to everyone. And one who wants a book, then the book can be easily found by him. If a book cannot be found by oneself, one can seek the help of hired handlers."

In keeping with the Islamic tradition of knowledge, the Fatimids collected books on a variety of subjects and their libraries attracted the attention of scholars from around the world. The Imam-Caliph al-Hakim was a great patron of learning and provided paper, pens, ink and inkstands without charge to all those who wished to study there.

See also
 House of Wisdom
 Mu'ayyad fid-Din al-Shirazi
 Library of Alexandria
 Al-Azhar University
 Madrasah
 Nalanda
 Takṣaśilā
 Fatimid Great Palaces

References

1004 establishments
11th-century establishments in Egypt
Educational institutions established in the 11th century
Cairo under the Fatimid Caliphate
Libraries in Egypt
Shia Islam
Universities in Egypt
Defunct libraries
11th-century establishments in the Fatimid Caliphate